Ditrichum is a genus of haplolepideous mosses (Dicranidae) in the family Ditrichaceae.

Species
The genus contains the following species:

Ditrichum amoenum 
Ditrichum apophysatum 
Ditrichum astomoides 
Ditrichum atlanticum 
Ditrichum aureum 
Ditrichum austrogeorgicum 
Ditrichum blindioides 
Ditrichum bogotense 
Ditrichum boryanum 
Ditrichum brachycarpum 
Ditrichum brachypodum 
Ditrichum breidleri 
Ditrichum brevidens 
Ditrichum brevirostre 
Ditrichum brevisetum 
Ditrichum brotherusii 
Ditrichum buchananii 
Ditrichum canadense 
Ditrichum canariense 
Ditrichum capense 
Ditrichum capillaceum 
Ditrichum capillare 
Ditrichum colijnii 
Ditrichum conicum 
Ditrichum cornubicum 
Ditrichum crinale 
Ditrichum cylindricarpum 
Ditrichum darjeelingense 
Ditrichum difficile 
Ditrichum ditrichoideum 
Ditrichum divaricatum 
Ditrichum elongatum 
Ditrichum ferrugineum 
Ditrichum flexicaule 
Ditrichum fontanum 
Ditrichum francii 
Ditrichum gemmiferum 
Ditrichum glaciale 
Ditrichum glowackii 
Ditrichum gracile 
Ditrichum hallei 
Ditrichum heteromallum 
Ditrichum hookeri 
Ditrichum hyalinocuspidatum 
Ditrichum hyalinum 
Ditrichum immersum 
Ditrichum itatiaiae 
Ditrichum javense 
Ditrichum julaceum 
Ditrichum knappii 
Ditrichum laxissimum 
Ditrichum levieri 
Ditrichum lewis-smithii 
Ditrichum liliputanum 
Ditrichum lineare 
Ditrichum longisetum 
Ditrichum luteum 
Ditrichum macounii 
Ditrichum macrorhynchum 
Ditrichum madagassum 
Ditrichum mexicanum 
Ditrichum mittenii 
Ditrichum montanum 
Ditrichum nivale 
Ditrichum oblongum 
Ditrichum oldfieldii 
Ditrichum pancheri 
Ditrichum paulense 
Ditrichum perporodictyon 
Ditrichum pinetorum 
Ditrichum plagiacron 
Ditrichum plicatum 
Ditrichum plumbicola 
Ditrichum praealtum 
Ditrichum pseudorufescens 
Ditrichum punctulatum 
Ditrichum pusillum 
Ditrichum rhynchostegium 
Ditrichum roivanenii 
Ditrichum rufescens 
Ditrichum rufo-aureum 
Ditrichum schimperi 
Ditrichum sekii 
Ditrichum semilunare 
Ditrichum sericeum 
Ditrichum spinulosum 
Ditrichum strictiusculum 
Ditrichum strictum 
Ditrichum subaustrale 
Ditrichum subcapillaceum 
Ditrichum submersum 
Ditrichum subrufescens 
Ditrichum subulatum 
Ditrichum tenue 
Ditrichum tenuifolium 
Ditrichum tenuinerve 
Ditrichum tisserantii 
Ditrichum tomentosum 
Ditrichum tortipes 
Ditrichum tortuloides 
Ditrichum ulei 
Ditrichum validinervium 
Ditrichum viride

References

Dicranales
Moss genera
Taxonomy articles created by Polbot